M40 or M-40 may refer to:

Transportation 
 M40 motorway, a motorway in England
 M-40 (Michigan highway), a state highway in Michigan, US
 M40 (Cape Town), a Metropolitan Route in Cape Town, South Africa
 M40 (Johannesburg), a Metropolitan Route in Johannesburg, South Africa
 M40 (Pietermaritzburg), a Metropolitan Route in Pietermaritzburg, South Africa
 Autopista de Circunvalación M-40, a motorway in Madrid, Spain
 BMW M40, a 1987 automobile piston engine
 Charomskiy M-40, an aircraft engine
 Volvo M40 transmission, an automobile transmission

Science 
 Messier 40 (M40), a double star in the constellation Ursa Major
 the 40th Mersenne prime

Firearms and military equipment 
 M40 field protective mask, a United States military gas mask
 M40 rifle, a sniper rifle
 M40 Gun Motor Carriage, a United States self-propelled artillery vehicle
 M40 recoilless rifle, an anti-tank gun
 M/40 Automatic cannon, a Swedish heavy machine gun
 Macchi M.40, a prototype 1920s Italian catapult-launched reconnaissance seaplane
 The incorrect designation for the SSh-40, a Russian infantry helmet

Athletics 
 M 40, an age group for Masters athletics (athletes aged 35+)

Technology 

 Samsung Galaxy M40, a smartphone

See also 
 40M (disambiguation)